is a kabuki dance with lyrics written by Katsui Genpachi, choreography by Fujima Taisuke and music by Kineya Rokusaburô IV, first performed in 1826.

Originally part of a set of five different dances performed as a sequence,  is the only one that has survived. The first time these dances were staged in 1826 at the Nakamura-za in Edo, actor Seki Sanjuro II performed all of them as part of his farewell performance.

One of many revisions to the play, playwright  and actor  created a new, more supernatural version of the dance, staged for the first time in March 1937 at the Kabuki-za. In this version, the maiden becomes the spirit of the wisteria.

 remains a popular and famous dance in the kabuki repertoire.

Characters 
The titular Wisteria Maiden is the only character seen in the play, and is accompanied by a  musical ensemble of singers, drums, flute and small gongs.

Plot

Translation 
The play was translated into English by Leonard C. Pronko in Kabuki Plays on Stage III: Darkness and Desire, 1804-1864, edited by James R. Brandon and Samuel L. Leiter and published in 2002.

 Kabuki Plays on Stage III: Kabuki Plays on Stage III: Darkness and Desire, 1804-1864. (2002) University of Hawaii Press,  .

External links

 Fuji Musume at Kabuki21.com
 Fuji Musume at Zen Garden

References 
 

1826 plays
Kabuki plays